Jemez Falls is a waterfall located in the Jemez Mountains of the Santa Fe National Forest. The falls are located on the East Fork of the Jemez River in an area dominated by Ponderosa Pine forests. Jemez Falls are the highest waterfalls in the Jemez Mountains. There are some smaller falls on the river just above the main falls. The falls are accessible from a trail that starts at the Jemez Falls campground and day use area. There is an overlook at the end of the trail.

References
Four Corners Region Geotourism Map
Santa Fe National Forest page

Waterfalls of New Mexico
Protected areas of Sandoval County, New Mexico
Cascade waterfalls
Landforms of Sandoval County, New Mexico